The Real is a term in Continental Philosophy.

The Real may also refer to:

Arts
"The Real", a song by Tracy Bonham on the album The Liverpool Sessions
"The Real" (The Boondocks), an episode of the animated television show
The Real (talk show), a daytime talk show

See also
Real (disambiguation)
The RealReal, a marketplace for authenticated luxury consignments